Antonio Valente (fl. 1565–80) was an Italian Renaissance organist and composer. He was blind from childhood and served as organist of Sant'Angelo a Nilo in Naples in 1565–80. During that time he published two collections of keyboard instruments music: Intavolatura de cimbalo (1 fantasia, 6 ricercares, Salve regina, 3 intabulations, 6 sets of variations, and 3 dances; 1575) and Versi spirituali (43 versets; 1580). Nothing else is known about his life. In 1601 he was listed among the deceased organists of Naples.

Valente's second collection is historically important as one of the earliest instances of liturgical music free from any ties with the chant. Versi spirituali provides a wealth of diverse, freely composed pieces that cover the entire liturgy—the Mass and the Daily Offices. Valente's 1575 print, although of considerably lower quality, is also a major landmark in the history of Italian keyboard music, for together with Rocco Rodio's Libro di ricercate (1575) it constitutes the earliest work of the so-called Neapolitan school, which later produced composers such as Ascanio Mayone and Giovanni Maria Trabaci.

Works 
 Intavolatura de cimbalo, for harpsichord
 Versi spirituali sopra tutti le note, for organ

References 
 Apel, Willi. 1972. The History of Keyboard Music to 1700. Translated by Hans Tischler. Indiana University Press. . Originally published as Geschichte der Orgel- und Klaviermusik bis 1700 by Bärenreiter-Verlag, Kassel.

External links 
 
 Versi spirituali

Blind classical musicians
Composers for pipe organ
Italian male classical composers
Italian classical composers
Renaissance composers
Year of death unknown
Year of birth unknown